was a short-lived political party in Meiji period Japan.

The Shimpotō was founded by Ōkuma Shigenobu in March 1896, as a merger of the Rikken Kaishintō and minor political parties to offset a temporary alliance between Ōkuma's rival, Itō Hirobumi and the Liberal Party of Japan (Jiyutō).

In June 1898, the Shimpotō merged with the Jiyutō to form the Kenseitō.

Election results

References

Defunct political parties in Japan
Political parties established in 1896
Political parties disestablished in 1898
1896 establishments in Japan
1898 disestablishments in Japan